Gelert is a British camping and outdoor clothing importer founded in Gwynedd, north Wales. Since 2013, it has been owned by Frasers Group.


History
The company is named after the dog Gelert of Prince Llywelyn the Great, who was Prince of Gwynedd. It started in Bryncir in Gwynedd in 1970.  In 2003 it announced plans for a £4.5 million expansion to its Porthmadog base, which opened in 2004.  It has the exclusive licence to the QuickPitch tent designed by Bournemouth University graduate Franziska Conrad.

In 2012 the company closed its Porthmadog headquarters, which it relocated to its Widnes site. In June 2013 the company went into administration and was taken over by Sports Direct International PLC.

Products

The products it sells are:
 Tents
 Sleeping bags
 Rucksacks
 Walking equipment
 Outdoor cooking equipment
 Torches and camping lights
 Outdoor clothing and walking boots
 Equestrian clothing
 Fishing clothing
 Workwear
 Pet equipment and some pet food

References

External links
 

Camping equipment manufacturers
Outdoor clothing brands
Clothing brands of the United Kingdom
Companies of Wales
Economy of Gwynedd
British companies established in 1975
Camping in the United Kingdom
British brands
Sports Direct